Vindula sapor is a butterfly from the family Nymphalidae found in New Guinea. It is sexually dimorphic.

Subspecies
Listed alphabetically.
V. s. albosignata Talbot, 1932 – (Solomons)
V. s. obscura (Ribbe, 1898) – (Bougainville, Shortlands)
V. s. sapor – (Guadalcanal, Arawa, Choiseul)

References

Vagrantini
Butterflies described in 1888